Waka Wañusqa (Quechua waka cow, wañusqa died, dead, "cow died" or "dead cow", also spelled Huaca Huanuskha) is a mountain in the Andes of Bolivia which reaches a height of approximately . It is located in the Potosí Department, Nor Chichas Province, Cotagaita Municipality.

References 

Mountains of Potosí Department